Li Xiang (Chinese:李响; Pinyin: Lǐ Xiǎng; born 16 February 1989 in Shenyang, Liaoning, China) is a Chinese football player.  He has played for Khonkaen F.C. since the 2011 season, when it was in the Thai Premier League.

References

1989 births
Living people
Footballers from Shenyang
Chinese footballers
Chinese expatriate footballers
Expatriate footballers in Thailand
Association football defenders
Chinese expatriate sportspeople in Thailand